Tregoose is a house near Grampound in Cornwall, England, UK.

References

Tregoose

Houses in Cornwall